Logan is a city and county seat of Harrison County, Iowa, United States, along the Boyer River. The population was 1,397 at the time of the 2020 census.

History

Logan was platted in 1867 when Chicago and North Western Railway was extended to that point. It was named for John A. Logan, a Union Army general.

Geography
Logan's longitude and latitude coordinates in decimal form are 41.644614, -95.789931.

Climate

Demographics

2010 census
As of the census of 2010, there were 1,534 people, 595 households, and 397 families living in the city. The racial makeup of the city was 98.6% White, 0.1% African American, 0.1% Native American, 0.4% Asian, and 0.8% from two or more races. Hispanic or Latino of any race were 0.8% of the population.

There were 595 households, of which 35.0% had children under the age of 18 living with them, 54.1% were married couples living together, 9.1% had a female householder with no husband present, 3.5% had a male householder with no wife present, and 33.3% were non-families. 27.2% of all households were made up of individuals, and 14.1% had someone living alone who was 65 years of age or older. The average household size was 2.49 and the average family size was 3.07.

The median age in the city was 38.5 years. 26.9% of residents were under the age of 18; 6.1% were between the ages of 18 and 24; 25.5% were from 25 to 44; 24.9% were from 45 to 64; and 16.7% were 65 years of age or older. The gender makeup of the city was 48.7% male and 51.3% female.

2000 census
As of the census of 2000, there were 1,545 people, 608 households, and 395 families living in the city. The racial makeup of the city was 99.29% White, 0.13% African American, 0.13% Native American, 0.13% Asian, 0.13% from other races, and 0.19% from two or more races. Hispanic or Latino of any race were 0.65% of the population.

There were 608 households, out of which 32.4% had children under the age of 18 living with them, 53.8% were married couples living together, 8.6% had a female householder with no husband present, and 35.0% were non-families. 32.2% of all households were made up of individuals, and 18.1% had someone living alone who was 65 years of age or older. The average household size was 2.43 and the average family size was 3.09.

Age spread: 27.1% under the age of 18, 6.1% from 18 to 24, 27.5% from 25 to 44, 18.2% from 45 to 64, and 21.1% who were 65 years of age or older. The median age was 38 years. For every 100 females, there were 90.0 males. For every 100 females age 18 and over, there were 79.9 males.

The median income for a household in the city was $35,455, and the median income for a family was $44,375. Males had a median income of $30,347 versus $20,625 for females. The per capita income for the city was $18,709. About 5.6% of families and 9.5% of the population were below the poverty line, including 10.0% of those under age 18 and 11.6% of those age 65 or over.

Education
Logan–Magnolia Community School District operates local public schools.

See also

Harrison County Courthouse

References

External links

City of Logan
Logan-Magnolia Community Schools
City-Data Comprehensive Statistical Data and more about Logan

Cities in Iowa
Cities in Harrison County, Iowa
County seats in Iowa